The Big Fix is a 2012 documentary film about two filmmakers, Josh and Rebecca Tickell, as they travel along the coast of the Gulf of Mexico meeting the residents whose lives were changed by the Deepwater Horizon oil spill. The film argues that BP has utilized the oil dispersant Corexit in the Gulf to create the illusion that the Louisiana beaches are safe and the water (and seafood) uncontaminated.

The film briefly features an interview with G4S security guard Omar Mateen, who four years later would perpetrate the 2016 Orlando nightclub shooting.

Participants
 Jean-Michel Cousteau
 Jeff Goodell 
Chris Hedges
 Bobby Jindal
 David Korten
 Omar Mateen 
 Jim McDermott
 Ed Overton

Festivals and awards

Official Selection – Cannes Film Festival (The Big Fix was the only US documentary chosen as an Official Selection at the Cannes Film Festival in 2011.)
Winner, Best Documentary – Italian Environmental Film Festival
Winner, Best Documentary – International Water and Film Festival
Opening Night Movie – New Orleans Film Festival
Official Selection – Durban Film Festival
Official Selection – Best of Fest – IDFA
Official Selection – Rio de Janeiro Film Festival
Official Selection – Boulder International Film Festival
Official Selection – Sedona Film Festival
Official Selection – DC Environmental Film Festival
Official Selection – Hawaii International Film Festival
Official Selection – Tallahassee Film Festival
Official Selection – Bergen International Film Festival

References

External links
 
 Green Planet Productions
 
 
 

2012 films
Documentary films about water and the environment
Deepwater Horizon oil spill
Documentary films about petroleum
Films directed by Josh Tickell
2010s English-language films